The Stachelberg fortress (also known as Ježová hora) is one of the largest fortresses in the Czech Republic. It was built as a complex of 12 bunkers between 1937 and 1938 as a Czechoslovak fort. However, the process of construction was stopped due to the Munich Agreement in 1938. Therefore, the fortress has never been finished.

Location 
The Stachelberg fortress is located just northwest of Babí, between Trutnov and Žacléř. Moreover, there is Rýchorský prales (Virgin Forest) close to it. The place is frequently called the foot of the Krkonoše (Giant Mountains).

Purpose of its construction 
The Stachelberg fortress was built as protection for Labavské sedlo (Saddleback), which is the land gate between the Krkonoše and Vraní hory. These places were usually a target of foreign armies and the Czech army led an attack on foreign armies from this place. However, the fortress has never been finished and nowadays it is used as an army museum.

Current situation 
The museum in Stachelberg has been opened since 1993 and the owners expand the accessible parts of the fortress every year. The last extension was accomplished in 2010, which extended the sightseeing for more than an hour. The visitors can see the whole of its underground barracks.
The first owner of this fortress was Fortis company, which is located in Trutnov. However, the owner changed in 2005 and presently it is owned by the Stachelberg Civic Association, a group of enthusiasts, who consider their job a hobby and do it voluntarily. It is worth mentioning that the fortress is financed only by the visitors’ entrance fee and occasionally by donors who are willing to help.

External links 
 http://www.stachelberg.cz/

References 
 Czech Republic - Land of Stories (2012) Stachelberg Fortress, [Online] Available at: http://www.czechtourism.com/c/stachelberg/  [Accessed 29 November 2013]
 M. Kejzlar, (2008) Opevnění na Trutnovsku, Fort print: Dvůr Králové nad Labem 2008

Forts in the Czech Republic